Acanthaclisini is a tribe in the antlion subfamily Acanthaclisinae.

The larvae of most species live in open tracts of fairly deep sand, and do not construct pitfall traps. They burrow beneath the surface of the sand which needs to be deep enough to allow temperature regulation, concealment from predators and space to hunt prey. Many hunt both on the soil surface and beneath it.

Genera
These 16 genera belong to the tribe Acanthaclisini:

 Acanthaclisis Rambur, 1842 i c g
 Arcuaplectron New, 1985 i c g
 Centroclisis Navás, 1909 i c g
 Cosina Navás, 1912 i c g
 Fadrina Navás, 1912 i c g
 Heoclisis Navás, 1923 i c g
 Jaya Navás, 1912 i c g
 Madrastra Navás, 1912 i c g
 Mestressa Navás, 1914 i c g
 Paranthaclisis Banks, 1907 i c g b
 Phanoclisis Banks, 1913 i c g
 Stiphroneura Gerstaecker, 1885 i c g
 Synclisis Navás, 1919 i c g
 Syngenes Kolbe, 1897 i c g
 Vella Navas, 1913 i c g b
 Vellasa Navás, 1924 i g

Data sources: i = ITIS, c = Catalogue of Life, g = GBIF, b = Bugguide.net

References

External links 

 

 
Insect tribes